In electronics, a wafer (also called a slice or substrate) is a thin slice of semiconductor, such as a crystalline silicon (c-Si), used for the fabrication of integrated circuits and, in photovoltaics, to manufacture solar cells. The wafer serves as the substrate for microelectronic devices built in and upon the wafer. It undergoes many microfabrication processes, such as doping, ion implantation, etching, thin-film deposition of various materials, and photolithographic patterning. Finally, the individual microcircuits are separated by wafer dicing and packaged as an integrated circuit.

History 

In the semiconductor or silicon wafer industry, the term wafer appeared in the 1950s to describe a thin round slice of semiconductor material, typically germanium or silicon. Round shape comes from single-crystal ingots usually produced using the Czochralski method. Silicon wafers were first introduced in the 1940s.

By 1960, silicon wafers were being manufactured in the U.S. by companies such as MEMC/SunEdison. In 1965, American engineers Eric O. Ernst, Donald J. Hurd, and Gerard Seeley, while working under IBM, filed Patent US3423629A for the first high-capacity epitaxial apparatus.

Silicon wafers are made by companies such as Sumco, Shin-Etsu Chemical, Hemlock Semiconductor Corporation and Siltronic.

Production

Formation 

Wafers are formed of highly pure,
nearly defect-free single crystalline material, with a purity of 99.9999999% (9N) or higher.
One process for forming crystalline wafers is known as the Czochralski method, invented by Polish chemist Jan Czochralski. In this process, a cylindrical ingot of high purity monocrystalline semiconductor, such as silicon or germanium, called a boule, is formed by pulling a seed crystal from a melt. Donor impurity atoms, such as boron or phosphorus in the case of silicon, can be added to the molten intrinsic material in precise amounts in order to dope the crystal, thus changing it into an extrinsic semiconductor of n-type or p-type.

The boule is then sliced with a wafer saw (a type of wire saw), machined to improve flatness, chemically etched to remove crystal damage from machining steps and finally polished to form wafers. The size of wafers for photovoltaics is 100–200 mm square and the thickness is 100–500 μm. Electronics use wafer sizes from 100 to 450 mm diameter. The largest wafers made have a diameter of 450 mm, but are not yet in general use.

Cleaning, texturing and etching 

Wafers are cleaned with weak acids to remove unwanted particles. There are several standard cleaning procedures to make sure the surface of a silicon wafer contains no contamination. One of the most effective methods is RCA clean.
When used for solar cells, the wafers are textured to create a rough surface to increase surface area and so their efficiency. The generated PSG (phosphosilicate glass) is removed from the edge of the wafer in the etching.

Wafer properties

Standard wafer sizes

Silicon 
Silicon wafers are available in a variety of diameters from 25.4 mm (1 inch) to 300 mm (11.8 inches). Semiconductor fabrication plants, colloquially known as fabs, are defined by the diameter of wafers that they are tooled to produce. The diameter has gradually increased to improve throughput and reduce cost with the current state-of-the-art fab using , with a proposal to adopt . Intel, TSMC, and Samsung were separately conducting research to the advent of  "prototype" (research) fabs, though serious hurdles remain.

Wafers grown using materials other than silicon will have different thicknesses than a silicon wafer of the same diameter. Wafer thickness is determined by the mechanical strength of the material used; the wafer must be thick enough to support its own weight without cracking during handling. The tabulated thicknesses relate to when that process was introduced, and are not necessarily correct currently, for example the IBM BiCMOS7WL process is on 8-inch wafers, but these are only 200 μm thick. The weight of the wafer goes up along with its thickness and diameter.

Historical increases of wafer size 
A unit of wafer fabrication step, such as an etch step, can produce more chips proportional to the increase in wafer area, while the cost of the unit fabrication step goes up more slowly than the wafer area. This was the cost basis for increasing wafer size. Conversion to 300 mm wafers from 200 mm wafers began in early 2000, and reduced the price per die for about 30–40%. Larger diameter wafers allow for more die per wafer.

Photovoltaic 

M1 wafer size (156.75 mm) is in the process of being phased out in China as of 2020. Various nonstandard wafer sizes have arisen, so efforts to fully adopt the M10 standard (182 mm) are ongoing. Like other semiconductor fabrication processes, driving down costs has been the main driving factor for this attempted size increase, in spite of the differences in the manufacturing processes of different types of devices.

Crystalline orientation 

Wafers are grown from crystal having a regular crystal structure, with silicon having a diamond cubic structure with a lattice spacing of 5.430710 Å (0.5430710 nm). When cut into wafers, the surface is aligned in one of several relative directions known as crystal orientations. Orientation is defined by the Miller index with (100) or (111) faces being the most common for silicon.
Orientation is important since many of a single crystal's structural and electronic properties are highly anisotropic. Ion implantation depths depend on the wafer's crystal orientation, since each direction offers distinct paths for transport.

Wafer cleavage typically occurs only in a few well-defined directions. Scoring the wafer along cleavage planes allows it to be easily diced into individual chips ("dies") so that the billions of individual circuit elements on an average wafer can be separated into many individual circuits.

Crystallographic orientation notches 

Wafers under 200 mm diameter have flats cut into one or more sides indicating the crystallographic planes of the wafer (usually a {110} face). In earlier-generation wafers a pair of flats at different angles additionally conveyed the doping type (see illustration for conventions). Wafers of 200 mm diameter and above use a single small notch to convey wafer orientation, with no visual indication of doping type. 450 mm wafers are notchless, relying on a laser scribed structure on the wafer surface for orientation.

Impurity doping 

Silicon wafers are generally not 100% pure silicon, but are instead formed with an initial impurity doping concentration between 1013 and 1016 atoms per cm3 of boron, phosphorus, arsenic, or antimony which is added to the melt and defines the wafer as either bulk n-type or p-type. However, compared with single-crystal silicon's atomic density of 5×1022 atoms per cm3, this still gives a purity greater than 99.9999%. The wafers can also be initially provided with some interstitial oxygen concentration. Carbon and metallic contamination are kept to a minimum. Transition metals, in particular, must be kept below parts per billion concentrations for electronic applications.

450 mm wafers

Challenges 
There is considerable resistance to the 450 mm transition despite the possible productivity improvement, because of concern about insufficient return on investment. There are also issues related to increased inter-die / edge-to-edge wafer variation and additional edge defects. 450mm wafers are expected to cost 4 times as much as 300mm wafers, and equipment costs are expected to rise by 20 to 50%. Higher cost semiconductor fabrication equipment for larger wafers increases the cost of 450 mm fabs (semiconductor fabrication facilities or factories). Lithographer Chris Mack claimed in 2012 that the overall price per die for 450 mm wafers would be reduced by only 10–20% compared to 300 mm wafers, because over 50% of total wafer processing costs are lithography-related. Converting to larger 450 mm wafers would reduce price per die only for process operations such as etch where cost is related to wafer count, not wafer area. Cost for processes such as lithography is proportional to wafer area, and larger wafers would not reduce the lithography contribution to die cost.

Nikon planned to deliver 450-mm lithography equipment in 2015, with volume production in 2017. In November 2013 ASML paused development of 450-mm lithography equipment, citing uncertain timing of chipmaker demand.

In 2012, a group consisting of New York State (SUNY Poly/College of Nanoscale Science and Engineering (CNSE)), Intel, TSMC, Samsung, IBM, Globalfoundries and Nikon companies has formed a public-private partnership called Global 450mm Consortium (G450C, similar to SEMATECH) who made a 5-year plan (expiring in 2016) to develop a "cost effective wafer fabrication infrastructure, equipment prototypes and tools to enable coordinated industry transition to 450mm wafer level". In the mid of 2014 CNSE has announced that it will reveal first fully patterned 450mm wafers at SEMICON West. In early 2017, the G450C began to dismantle its activities over 450mm wafer research due to undisclosed reasons. Various sources have speculated that demise of the group came after charges of bid rigging made against Alain E. Kaloyeros, who at the time was a chief executive at the SUNY Poly. The industry realization of the fact that the 300mm manufacturing optimization is more cheap than costly 450mm transition may also have played a role.

The timeline for 450 mm has not been fixed. In 2012, it was expected that 450mm production would start in 2017, which never realized. Mark Durcan, then CEO of Micron Technology, said in February 2014 that he expects 450 mm adoption to be delayed indefinitely or discontinued. "I am not convinced that 450mm will ever happen but, to the extent that it does, it’s a long way out in the future. There is not a lot of necessity for Micron, at least over the next five years, to be spending a lot of money on 450mm."

"There is a lot of investment that needs to go on in the equipment community to make that happen. And the value at the end of the day – so that customers would buy that equipment – I think is dubious." As of March 2014, Intel Corporation expected 450 mm deployment by 2020 (by the end of this decade). Mark LaPedus of semiengineering.com reported in mid-2014 that chipmakers had delayed adoption of 450 mm "for the foreseeable future." According to this report some observers expected 2018 to 2020, while G. Dan Hutcheson, chief executive of VLSI Research, didn't see 450mm fabs moving into production until 2020 to 2025.

The step up to 300 mm required major changes, with fully automated factories using 300 mm wafers versus barely automated factories for the 200 mm wafers, partly because a FOUP for 300 mm wafers weighs about 7.5 kilograms when loaded with 25 300 mm wafers where a SMIF weighs about 4.8 kilograms when loaded with 25 200 mm wafers, thus requiring twice the amount of physical strength from factory workers, and increasing fatigue. 300mm FOUPs have handles so that they can be still be moved by hand. 450mm FOUPs weigh 45 kilograms when loaded with 25 450 mm wafers, thus cranes are necessary to manually handle the FOUPs and handles are no longer present in the FOUP. FOUPs are moved around using material handling systems from Muratec or Daifuku. These major investments were undertaken in the economic downturn following the dot-com bubble, resulting in huge resistance to upgrading to 450 mm by the original timeframe. On the ramp-up to 450 mm, the crystal ingots will be 3 times heavier (total weight a metric ton) and take 2–4 times longer to cool, and the process time will be double. All told, the development of 450 mm wafers requires significant engineering, time, and cost to overcome.

Analytical die count estimation 
In order to minimize the cost per die, manufacturers wish to maximize the number of dies that can be made from a single wafer; dies always have a square or rectangular shape due to the constraint of wafer dicing. In general, this is a computationally complex problem with no analytical solution, dependent on both the area of the dies as well as their aspect ratio (square or rectangular) and other considerations such as the width of the scribeline or saw lane, and additional space occupied by alignment and test structures. Note that gross DPW formulas account only for wafer area that is lost because it cannot be used to make physically complete dies; gross DPW calculations do not account for yield loss due to defects or parametric issues.

Nevertheless, the number of gross die per wafer (DPW) can be estimated starting with the first-order approximation or floor function of wafer-to-die area ratio,
,
where
  is the wafer diameter (typically in mm)
  the size of each die (mm2) including the width of the scribeline ( or in the case of a saw lane, the kerf plus a tolerance).

This formula simply states that the number of dies which can fit on the wafer cannot exceed the area of the wafer divided by the area of each individual die. It will always overestimate the true best-case gross DPW, since it includes the area of partially patterned dies which do not fully lie on the wafer surface (see figure). These partially patterned dies don't represent complete ICs, so they cannot be sold as functional parts.

Refinements of this simple formula typically add an edge correction, to account for partial dies on the edge, which in general will be more significant when the area of the die is large compared to the total area of the wafer. In the other limiting case (infinitesimally small dies or infinitely large wafers), the edge correction is negligible.

The correction factor or correction term generally takes one of the forms cited by De Vries:

 (area ratio – circumference/(die diagonal length))

or 

Compound semiconductors 

While silicon is the prevalent material for wafers used in the electronics industry, other compound III-V or II-VI materials have also been employed. Gallium arsenide (GaAs), a III-V semiconductor produced via the Czochralski method, gallium nitride (GaN) and silicon carbide (SiC) are also common wafer materials, with GaN and sapphire being extensively used in LED manufacturing.

See also 

 Die preparation
 Epitaxial wafer
 Epitaxy
 Klaiber's law
 Monocrystalline silicon
 Polycrystalline silicon
 Rapid thermal processing
 RCA clean
 SEMI font
 Silicon on insulator (SOI) wafers
 Solar cell
 Solar panel
 Wafer bonding

References

External links 

 Evolution of the Silicon Wafer by F450C -An infographic about the history of the silicon wafer.

Semiconductor device fabrication